Communist League of Luxemburg, was an anti-revisionist Marxist-Leninist political organization in Luxembourg. ASSOSS was originally a left liberal organization founded in 1912 which moved leftward in the sixties. In 1969 it was transformed in the radical  (GSR). After the split of the trotskyist  (LCR) in 1970 the majority of GSR was renamed in KBL in 1972. In 1972  (KGL) split from KBL. In 1975  (KOL/ML) broke away but returned in 1978.

In 1979 KBL was the driving force behind the electoral  which won 0,7 p.c. in the parliamentary elections. In the same year the majority of KBL left and founded the short-lived organization . The KBL ceased activities in 1980.

The secretary of KBL was Charles Doerner. Other leading members were  Jean Heisbourg, Robert Medernach, Lucien Blau, Thers Bodé.

KBL published  and since 1977  (Red Banner).

References 

1970 establishments in Luxembourg
Communist parties in Luxembourg
Stalinist parties
Maoist organizations in Europe
Defunct political parties in Luxembourg
Political parties established in 1972
Political parties disestablished in 1980